Liolaemus yanalcu is a species of lizard in the family Iguanidae.  It is from Argentina.

References

yanalcu
Lizards of South America
Reptiles of Argentina
Endemic fauna of Argentina
Reptiles described in 2002